Pavel Trubila (born 5 June 1991) is a Belarusian former professional footballer. 

His brother Vitali Trubila is also a professional footballer and former Belarus international player.

External links

1991 births
Living people
Belarusian footballers
Association football defenders
FC Gomel players
FC Rechitsa-2014 players
FC Dnepr Mogilev players
FC Lokomotiv Gomel players
FC Sputnik Rechitsa players